Ten Men is a novel by Alexandra Gray that was first published in 2005. Episodic in character, it covers a period of 20 years in the life of the first person narrator, an attractive nameless Englishwoman in search of perfect happiness, a state she equates with life with a perfect partner. Ten Men is a serious treatment of the common "chick lit" motif of "waiting for Mr Right". In her late thirties and childless at the end of the novel, the heroine has had relationships with a succession of men but has not been able to achieve the happiness and peace of mind she has been longing for all her adult life. According to WorldCat, the book is found in over 200 United States libraries .

Plot introduction
Ten Men is a picaresque novel in that the heroine is constantly "moving on", time and again leaving behind the people she has been intimate with and associating with a new set in some other part of the world. The novel asks the basic question of how many men a woman "needs" until she has found the right partner and thus fulfilment in life—a question which, although frequently discussed in the wake of the sexual revolution, has turned out to be largely unanswerable.

Plot summary

The protagonist is born in the mid-1960s. After her father's premature death  when she is seven, she and her sister are brought up in England by their mother, who is a French Catholic. Conditioned to believe that pre-marital sex is a sin(it is), at 18 the heroine is forced into an early marriage with a teacher, who works literally day and night at a remote boarding school for boys. Stripped of her privacy and her youthful ways, she clings to her husband, hoping he will take a job elsewhere. When he does not she deserts him and embarks on a series of affairs with wealthy men who are not interested in a long-term relationship with her: a lawyer, a capitalist ("the Billionaire"), a Lord.

Similar to Caroline Meeber in Dreiser's Sister Carrie, the protagonist is not prepared to earn a living through honest work dependent on her qualifications. Accordingly, she always has to rely financially on the men in her life. In particular, it is the billionaire who, as a kind of parting present, volunteers to pay for her very expensive university education at some exclusive New York college as well as for her Upper East Side apartment.

After her graduation the protagonist eventually moves back to London. An affair with a sexually inexperienced man ("the Virgin") leads to her first pregnancy ever and a subsequent miscarriage. Having trained as an actress, she gets a few jobs in TV commercials. When she meets her ex-husband again it is only to find out that he is going to get married again. At the end of the novel, aged about 38 and still indecisive, she meets a single father who might become her future partner.

References

2005 British novels
Chick lit novels
Picaresque novels
Atlantic Books books